The National Union of Knitwear, Footwear and Apparel Trades (KFAT) was a trade union in the United Kingdom.

History

The National Union of Knitwear, Footwear and Apparel Trades was formed in 1991 through the amalgamation of the National Union of Hosiery and Knitwear Workers and the National Union of the Footwear, Leather and Allied Trades. It had 82,303 members when it was formed. KFAT organised a range of clothing-related workers and was particularly strong in areas of the East Midlands including Nottinghamshire, Leicestershire and Northamptonshire, with other members in Lancashire textile regions and the Yorkshire leather-producing industry. It absorbed the Rossendale Union of Boot, Shoe and Slipper Operatives in the mid 1990s. The union was notable for its high proportion of female members - roughly half of its members in 2004 being women.

After initially considering amalgamation with the National Union of Tailors and Garment Workers KFAT merged with the Iron and Steel Trades Confederation in 2004 to form Community.

Leadership

General presidents
1991: David Lambert
1994: Helen McGrath
1999: Tony Hallam

General secretaries
1991: George Browett
1992: Helen McGrath
1994: Paul Gates

References

External links
Catalogue of the KFAT archives, held at the Modern Records Centre, University of Warwick

Defunct trade unions of the United Kingdom
Textile and clothing trade unions
1991 establishments in the United Kingdom
Trade unions established in 1991
Trade unions disestablished in 2004
Trade unions based in Leicestershire